Nongstoin College, established in 1978, is a general degree college situated at Nongstoin, in West Khasi Hills district, Meghalaya. The college is affiliated with the North Eastern Hill University. The college offers bachelor's degree in arts, science and commerce.

References

External links
http://nongstoincollege.ac.in

Universities and colleges in Meghalaya
Colleges affiliated to North-Eastern Hill University
Educational institutions established in 1978
1978 establishments in Meghalaya